The Haynes Owner's Workshop Manuals (commonly known as Haynes Manuals) are a series of practical manuals from the British publisher Haynes Publishing Group. The series primarily focuses upon the maintenance and repair of automotive vehicles, covering a wide range of makes and models (300 models of car and 130 models of motorcycle); the manuals are aimed mainly at DIY enthusiasts rather than professional garage mechanics, as they lack the depth of coverage on particular vehicles or problems. The series includes a range of 'practical lifestyle' manuals in the same style for a range of topics, including domestic appliances and personal computers, digital photography, model railways, sport, animal care, men,
babies,
sex, and women. They also now publish the Bluffer's Guides collection.

Additionally, Haynes have released manuals based on popular fictional series including Star Trek and Thomas and Friends.

History
The Haynes manuals are named after John Harold Haynes (1938–2019) OBE. In 1956, when he was at school, he wrote and published a book on building a 'special' based on the Austin 7, and wrote two further books while performing national service in the Royal Air Force. J. H. Haynes & Co. Limited was founded on 18 May 1960 and the first manual actually entitled "Haynes Owners Workshop Manual", for the Austin-Healey Sprite, was published in 1965. Haynes was made an Officer of Order of the British Empire in the Queen's Birthday Honours List 1995 for services to publishing.  He died on 8 February 2019, aged 80.

Many Haynes Manuals bear a cover illustration of a cutaway view technical drawing of the vehicle, hand-drawn by Terry Davey, and they bear his signature. Haynes also publishes a range of Chilton manuals under license from Cengage.

In 2013, Haynes acquired Clymer repair manuals from Penton Media. In 2020, Haynes was acquired by Infopro Digital, a technical data company owned by TowerBrook Capital Partners, for  million.

End of new repair manual production
It was announced in December 2020 that Haynes would not produce any new repair manuals in the traditional style. All new repair content would be online only. Pre-existing titles remain available.

Stripdown and rebuild
The automotive vehicle manuals are based upon taking apart and putting together a vehicle. The cover of each manual states: "based on a complete strip-down and rebuild". Each section has step-by-step instructions with diagrams and photographs of an actual strip-down or rebuild.

For professionals
Manuals for garage professionals include books such as the Automotive Diesel Engine Service Guide, the Automotive Air Conditioning TechBook, Citroën and Peugeot Engine Management Systems, and two Engine Management and Fuel Injection Systems Pin Tables and Wiring Diagrams TechBook volumes.

Distribution
Haynes manuals are published in 15 languages: English (including British, American and Australian variants), French, Swedish, Chinese, Japanese, German, Czech, Finnish, Polish, Bulgarian, Hebrew, Greek, Danish, Spanish (including American Spanish versions), and Russian.

Location
The company is based in Sparkford, a village near Yeovil in Somerset, England. The Haynes International Motor Museum, is also in Sparkford and it is home to a large collection of both classic and modern cars, and many rarities.

Authorship
Haynes manuals are written by a pair of authors, a process which takes between 20 and 30 weeks.  The car or motorcycle is bought at the beginning of the project and sold at the end.

Although the workshop phase of the project usually lasts for roughly four weeks, the vehicle is usually retained for a couple of months to ensure it is functioning correctly.

Manufacturers
Haynes generally has the co-operation of the manufacturers to provide technical information such as mechanical tolerances and wiring diagrams. Haynes claims this provides customers with information that lets them fix their vehicle, to their ability, or at least diagnose the fault before taking it to a garage.

Over the lifetime of a vehicle, the aftermarket is worth perhaps as much as the new cost price of the vehicle, so the manufacturer still gets a significant revenue from the spare parts, so the longer a vehicle lasts, the more spare parts and servicing can be sold to the owner.

Fictional vehicles 

See also
Chilton Company
Clymer repair manual
How-to
G. T. Foulis

References

External links
Haynes web site
Haynes US web site
Haynes Australia web site

Procedural knowledge
Technical communication
Automotive handbooks and manuals